Adam Roman Żurowski (3 March 1929 – 25 March 2016) was a geodesist, Professor of technical sciences, Dean of the Faculty of Civil and Environmental Engineering (1990-1993), and Head of the Department of Geodesy (1985–1999) at the Gdańsk University of Technology.

References

1929 births
2016 deaths
Academic staff of the Gdańsk University of Technology
Polish geodesists
Gdańsk University of Technology alumni
Scientists from Lviv